Braden David Bruce Mclean (born ) is a Canadian male volleyball player. He is part of the Canada men's national volleyball team.

References

External links
 profile at FIVB.org

1991 births
Canadian men's volleyball players
Living people